John Cornyn III (born February 2, 1952) is an American politician and attorney serving as the senior United States senator from Texas, a seat he has held since 2002. A member of the Republican Party, he served as the Senate majority whip for the 114th and 115th Congresses, and previously served as chair of the National Republican Senatorial Committee from 2009 to 2013.

Born in Houston, Cornyn is a graduate of Trinity University and St. Mary's University School of Law, and received an LL.M. degree from the University of Virginia School of Law. He was a judge on Texas's 37th District Court from 1985 to 1991. He was elected an associate justice of the Texas Supreme Court, where he served from 1991 to 1997. In 1998, Cornyn was elected Attorney General of Texas, serving one term until winning a seat in the U.S. Senate in 2002. He was reelected in 2008, 2014, and 2020.

Early life, education and legal career
Cornyn was born in Houston, the second child of Atholene Gale Cornyn (née Danley) and John Cornyn II, a colonel in the U.S. Air Force. He attended the American School in Japan after his family moved to Tokyo in 1968, and graduated from it in 1969. In 1973, he graduated from Trinity University, where he majored in journalism and was a member of Chi Delta Tau. Cornyn earned a Juris Doctor from St. Mary's University School of Law in 1977 and an LL.M. from the University of Virginia School of Law in 1995. He was named the St. Mary's Distinguished Law School Graduate in 1994 and a Trinity University Distinguished Alumnus in 2001.

In 1988, Cornyn attended a two-week seminar at Oxford University jointly hosted by the National Judicial College at the University of Nevada, Reno and Florida State University Law School. The seminar, held on the Oxford campus, was not academically affiliated with the university.

Cornyn served as a district judge in San Antonio for six years before being elected as a Republican in 1990 to the Texas Supreme Court, on which he served for seven years.

Texas attorney general

1998 election
In 1998, Cornyn ran for Texas attorney general. In the March Republican primary, Railroad Commissioner Barry Williamson received 38% of the vote and Cornyn, a former Texas Supreme Court justice, 32%. In the April runoff election, Cornyn defeated Williamson, 58% to 42%. Cornyn won the general election with 54% of the vote; he defeated Jim Mattox, a former Texas attorney general (1983–1991) and U.S. Representative. Cornyn was the first Republican-elected attorney general of Texas since Reconstruction, and was sworn in by Governor George W. Bush.

Tenure

Cornyn created the Texas Internet Bureau to investigate illegal internet practices. He fought government waste and corruption by investigating fraudulent Medicare and Medicaid claims.

Cornyn was criticized by civil rights groups for failing to investigate in a timely manner the false drug convictions of numerous African Americans in Tulia, Texas. On September 6, 2002, The Austin Chronicle reported that Cornyn had announced that his office would investigate the 1999 drug bust, where the testimony of one narcotics agent led to the arrests of 46 people, 43 of whom were Black.

In 2005, Cornyn was mentioned as a possible replacement for Supreme Court Justices Sandra Day O'Connor and William Rehnquist.

United States Senate

Elections

2002 

In the 2002 Republican primary, Cornyn faced five opponents. Cornyn defeated his closest Republican challenger, self-financed Dallas-based international physician Bruce Rusty Lang, in the election by a ten-to-one margin. In the general election, Cornyn defeated Democratic nominee Ron Kirk in a campaign that cost each candidate over $9 million.

2008 

Texas has not elected a Democrat in a statewide election since 1994, and according to Rasmussen Reports polling, Cornyn had an approval rating of 50% in October 2008. Christian activist Larry Kilgore of Mansfield challenged Cornyn in the Republican primary, but Cornyn easily defeated him. Texas Representative Rick Noriega won the March4 Democratic primary against Gene Kelly, Ray McMurrey, and Rhett Smith. Yvonne Adams Schick was the Libertarian Party's nominee, and the Green Party of Texas sought ballot access for its candidate, David B. Collins. The same Rasmussen poll showed Cornyn leading Noriega 47% to 43%, suggesting that the race might prove unexpectedly competitive, but most polls showed a much wider margin, and Cornyn was reelected.

2014 

Cornyn was reelected in 2014, and according to the Dallas Morning News, "never broke a sweat". He won the March Republican primary with 59% of the vote against Houston-area congressman Steve Stockman. In the general election, he raised $14 million, outspending Democratic nominee David Alameel by nearly 3-1. Cornyn won again by over 20 points.

2020 

Cornyn was reelected to a fourth term in 2020 in the closest of his Senate campaigns. He won the primary with 76% of the vote and then defeated Democrat MJ Hegar in a race that Cook Political rated "Lean Republican". Cornyn received more votes, 5,962,983, than any Republican Senate candidate had ever received before, breaking the record set by Pete Wilson of California in 1988. Hegar also set a record, getting more votes than any losing Democrat since Leo T. McCarthy in the 1988 California Senate race.

Tenure

In 2004, Cornyn co-founded and became the co-chairman of the U.S. Senate India Caucus. In December 2006, he was selected by his colleagues to join the five-person Republican Senate leadership team as Vice Chairman of the Senate Republican Conference.

In 2005, Cornyn gained notice by connecting the Supreme Court's reluctance to hear arguments for sustaining Terri Schiavo's life with the recent murders of Judge Joan Lefkow's husband and mother as well as the courtroom murder of Judge Rowland Barnes. Cornyn said: "I don't know if there is a cause-and-effect connection, but we have seen some recent episodes of courthouse violence in this country. I wonder whether there may be some connection between the perception in some quarters on some occasions where judges are making political decisions yet are unaccountable to the public, that it builds up and builds up and building up to the point where some people engage in violence." His statement and a similar one by House Majority Leader Tom DeLay were widely denounced, including by The New York Times. Cornyn later said that the statement was taken out of context and for that reason he regretted the statement.

On May 18, 2007, Cornyn was involved in an altercation with the late Senator John McCain. During a meeting on immigration, McCain and Cornyn had a shouting match when Cornyn started questioning the number of judicial appeals that illegal immigrants could receive. McCain yelled an insult at Cornyn and said "I know more about this than anyone else in the room." Previously, Cornyn told McCain, "Wait a second here. I've been sitting in here for all of these negotiations and you just parachute in here on the last day. You're out of line."

As chairman of the National Republican Senatorial Committee, Cornyn was a strong supporter of Norm Coleman's various court challenges to the 2008 election certification of the Minnesota U.S. Senate race. Cornyn advocated for Coleman to bring the case before the federal court, and said the trial and appeals could take years to complete. Cornyn threatened that Republicans would wage a "World War III" if Senate Democrats had attempted to seat Democratic candidate Al Franken before the appeals were complete. Coleman conceded after the Minnesota Supreme Court unanimously ruled that Franken had won the election.

Cornyn voted to confirm Samuel Alito as an Associate Justice of the Supreme Court of the United States and John Roberts for Chief Justice of the United States. In September 2005, during Roberts's Supreme Court hearings, Cornyn's staff passed out bingo cards to reporters. He asked them to stamp their card every time a Democrat on the Judiciary Committee used terms such as "far right" or "extremist". On July 24, 2009, Cornyn announced his intention to vote against President Obama's Supreme Court nominee Sonia Sotomayor, saying that she might rule "from a liberal, activist perspective".

On the day of Obama's inauguration, it was reported that Cornyn would prevent Hillary Clinton from being confirmed as secretary of state by unanimous floor vote that day. Senate Majority Leader Harry Reid's spokesman reported to the Associated Press that a roll call vote for the Clinton confirmation would be held instead on the following day, January 21, 2009, and that it was expected Clinton would "receive overwhelming bipartisan support". The vote was 94–2 in her favor, with only Senators Jim DeMint (R-SC) and David Vitter (R-LA) voting in opposition.

On March 18, 2020, Cornyn blamed the COVID-19 pandemic on cultural practices in China and mistakenly blamed China for the MERS and swine flu epidemics. His comments were criticized by some Democrats and the National Council of Asian Americans and Pacific Islanders. At the time, the consensus among researchers was that coronavirus had originated at a wet market in Wuhan, China.

Senate Majority Whip

On November 14, 2012, Cornyn was elected Senate Minority Whip by his peers.

Cornyn was named Senate Majority Whip after the 2014 election, in which Republicans gained a Senate majority.

After the death of Associate Supreme Court Justice Antonin Scalia in February 2016, Cornyn said that anyone Obama nominated to replace him would have a difficult confirmation process and feel like a piñata. He also said that no serious candidate would accept a nomination knowing that they would not be confirmed. When Obama nominated Merrick Garland to replace Scalia, Cornyn said that even if the president has the constitutional authority to nominate someone, the Senate has full authority on how to proceed. Cornyn also said that the voice of the people should play a role, and that the "only way to empower the American people" was having the vacancy be filled by the winner of the upcoming presidential election, so no hearings on Garland should be held. The Senate did not vote on Garland's nomination, which expired after the November election of President Donald Trump. Trump nominated Neil Gorsuch to the seat, and Gorsuch was confirmed. In September 2020, Cornyn supported a vote on Trump's nominee to fill the Supreme Court vacancy caused by the death of Justice Ruth Bader Ginsburg. In March 2016, he took the position that the Senate should not consider Obama's Supreme Court nominee.

On June 8, 2017, during a committee hearing whose announced topic was the Russian interference in the 2016 election and Comey's dismissal as FBI director, Cornyn opted instead to spend his time questioning James Comey on Hillary Clinton's email controversy.

In September 2018, during the Supreme Court nomination hearings for Brett Kavanaugh, Cornyn accused the Democrats on the Judiciary Committee of devolving into mob rule by breaking the rules of decorum when asking for postponement or adjournment of the hearing to obtain or review documents from Kavanaugh's time working for the George W. Bush administration. Cornyn said that it was hard to believe the Democrats' claim that they could not properly assess Kavanaugh without the documents because it seemed that their minds were already made up.

Committee assignments 
United States Senate Select Committee on Intelligence
Committee on Finance
Subcommittee on Health Care
Subcommittee on Taxation and IRS Oversight
Subcommittee on Energy, Natural Resources, and Infrastructure
Committee on the Judiciary
Subcommittee on the Constitution 
Subcommittee on Immigration, Refugees and Border Security (ranking member)
Subcommittee on Terrorism, Technology and Homeland Security
Caucus on International Narcotics Control

Political positions

Political scientists John M. Sides and Daniel J. Hopkins characterized Cornyn as "very conservative" in 2015. In 2013, National Journal ranked Cornyn the 14th-most conservative Senator. The Dallas Morning News considered him a reliable ally of President George W. Bush on most issues.

Abortion

Cornyn opposes abortion.

In 2007, Cornyn voted against expanding federal funding for stem cell research that utilized human embryonic stem cells. Cornyn instead pushed for "several alternatives that would use adult and cord blood stem cells for research [as those] methods have proven to be more productive, and they do not harm or destroy human embryos." As an alternative, Cornyn supported the Alternative Pluripotent Stem Cell Therapies Enhancement Act to aid research into techniques of deriving pluripotent stem cells without harming or destroying human embryos.

In 2019, when asked about an Alabama law that prohibited abortions (even in the case of rape or incest), Cornyn said it was an "Alabama state issue".

Civil rights and law enforcement

In the 2004 debate surrounding the Federal Marriage Amendment, Cornyn released an advance copy of a speech he was to give at The Heritage Foundation. In the speech, he wrote, "It does not affect your daily life very much if your neighbor marries a box turtle. But that does not mean it is right... Now you must raise your children up in a world where that union of man and box turtle is on the same legal footing as man and wife." According to his office, he removed the reference to the box turtle in the actual speech, but The Washington Post ran the quote, as did The Daily Show.

Cornyn sponsored a bill to allow law enforcement to force anyone arrested or detained by federal authorities to provide samples of their DNA, which would be recorded in a central database. He voted to recommend a constitutional ban on flag desecration and for a constitutional amendment defining marriage as between one man and one woman. He also voted for the reauthorization of the PATRIOT Act and extending its wiretap provision.

In a February 24, 2019 tweet, Cornyn mocked dictatorship, centralized power and democratic socialism by quoting Italian fascist leader Benito Mussolini as saying "We were the first to assert that the more complicated the forms assumed by civilization, the more restricted the freedom of the individual must become."

On June 25, 2022, after the Supreme Court overturned Roe v. Wade and Planned Parenthood v. Casey, Cornyn tweeted, "Now do Plessy vs Ferguson/Brown vs Board of Education" in response to former President Barack Obama condemning the reversal of Roe in part because of its standing as "50 years of precedent". Representative Joaquin Castro, who interpreted the tweet as advocating the return of segregation in schools, condemned the tweet as racist. Cornyn continued in another tweet, "Thank goodness some SCOTUS precedents are overruled"; Brown had overturned more than 50 years of precedent regarding the doctrine of "separate but equal" as defined by Plessy.

President Donald Trump
Cornyn has been described as an "immutable Trump ally". He frequently praised Trump during most of his presidential term. But in the weeks before his reelection campaign, amid a tightening race with Democratic nominee MJ Hegar, Cornyn began to distance himself from Trump. He said that he praised Trump in public but expressed disagreement with him in private.

During Trump's presidency, Cornyn and fellow Texas Senator Ted Cruz contributed to the appointment of multiple conservative judges to federal courts with jurisdiction over Texas.

Cornyn repeatedly defended Trump's decision to siphon resources from the Pentagon in order to build a wall on the Mexico border. In March and September 2019, he voted to ratify the maneuver, opposing congressional attempts to block Trump's action. But in late October 2020, as Cornyn was trying to distance himself from Trump, he claimed that he had never supported Trump's maneuver and that he opposed it.

Cornyn warned Trump about anticipated negative effects of restructuring tariffs on Mexican exports, saying, "We're holding a gun to our own heads by doing this." In January 2018, he was one of 36 Republican senators to sign a letter to Trump requesting that he preserve the North American Free Trade Agreement by modernizing it for the 21st-century economy. Cornyn urged Trump to restart trade talks on the Trans Pacific Partnership, which Trump called "a disaster".

In June 2020, amid reports that Russia had paid the Taliban bounties to kill American soldiers and that Trump had been briefed on the subject months earlier, Cornyn defended an assertion by Trump that he had never been briefed on the subject. Cornyn said, "I think the president can't single-handedly remember everything, I'm sure, that he's briefed on."

In response to reports that Trump would not be attending Joe Biden's inauguration, Cornyn told Cruz and other lawmakers "see you there", implying that he planned to attend, which he did.

On May 28, 2021, Cornyn voted against creating an independent commission to investigate the January 6 United States Capitol attack.

Foreign policy and national security

In December 2010, Cornyn was one of 26 senators to vote against the ratification of New Start, a nuclear arms reduction treaty between the United States and Russia that obliges both countries to have no more than 1,550 strategic warheads and 700 launchers deployed during the next seven years, and provides a continuation of on-site inspections that halted when START I expired the previous year. It was the first arms treaty with Russia in eight years.

In 2013, Cornyn said that, despite the sequester, the Pentagon would actually see its budget increase.

In April 2018, Cornyn was one of eight Republican senators to sign a letter to United States Secretary of the Treasury Steve Mnuchin and acting Secretary of State John Sullivan expressing "deep concern" over a United Nations report exposing "North Korean sanctions evasion involving Russia and China" and asserting that the findings "demonstrate an elaborate and alarming military-venture between rogue, tyrannical states to avoid United States and international sanctions and inflict terror and death upon thousands of innocent people" while calling it "imperative that the United States provides a swift and appropriate response to the continued use of chemical weapons used by President Assad and his forces, and works to address the shortcomings in sanctions enforcement".

Cornyn supported U.S. involvement in the Saudi Arabian-led intervention in Yemen. In December 2018 he said that the U.S. should stand with Saudi Arabia despite the assassination of Jamal Khashoggi, saying: "Saudi Arabia is fighting a proxy war against Iran in Yemen, and an overreaction, in my view, would mean that we cancel arms sales and simply abandon our ally."

As Majority Whip, Cornyn filed a resolution welcoming Israeli Prime Minister Benjamin Netanyahu, who was to address a joint meeting of Congress in March 2015, a resolution co-sponsored only by Republicans. Vice President Joe Biden and numerous Senate and House Democrats said they would not attend the address. Cornyn supported the Senate resolution, expressing objection to the UN Security Council Resolution 2334, which called Israeli settlement building in the occupied Palestinian territories a flagrant violation of international law.

Cornyn has been a vocal critic of the People's Republic of China. In August 2018, Cornyn urged the Trump administration to impose sanctions under the Global Magnitsky Act against Chinese officials responsible for human rights abuses against the Uyghur Muslim minority in western China's Xinjiang region. In a Washington Post opinion piece, Cornyn wrote that widespread adoption of Huawei technology could increase vulnerability to cyberattacks and endanger NATO troops engaged on 5G-equipped battlefields.  Cornyn heightened his anti-China advocacy during the COVID-19 pandemic and the U.S. withdrawal from Afghanistan. He has been widely accused of spreading the misinformation that MERS (Middle East respiratory syndrome) (a disease first reported from the Arabian peninsula) and the Swine Flu (an epidemic which first emerged in North America) originated from China, because allegedly "people eat bats and snakes and dogs and things like that." In addition charges of racism, a Washington Post article has noted that "none of the diseases he mentioned are linked to dogs and snakes" and that rattlesnake-eating is popular not in China, but in Cornyn's own Texas.

Upon the U.S. withdrawal from Afghanistan, Cornyn tweeted that the U.S. still has 30,000 troops in Taiwan (formally, the Republic of China); in fact, the U.S. has kept no troops in Taiwan since it normalized relations with the People's Republic of China. Cornyn has since deleted the inaccurate tweet and refused to respond to queries about it.

Economy

Cornyn voted to permanently repeal the estate tax and raise the estate tax exemption to $5 million. He voted in favor of $350 billion in tax cuts over 11 years and supported making the George W. Bush tax cuts permanent. He opposed extending the 2011 payroll tax holiday. He voted for the Emergency Economic Stabilization Act of 2008 but against the American Recovery and Reinvestment Act in 2009.

In 2008, Cornyn voted for the Troubled Asset Relief Program (TARP), also known as the Wall Street bailout, and later voted to end the program.

Environment

Cornyn voted against a measure recognizing that climate change is manmade. He was one of 22 senators to sign a letter to Trump urging him to withdraw the United States from the Paris Agreement. In May 2019, Cornyn said it was important that the United States take measures to combat climate change, but condemned the Green New Deal as proposed by Alexandria Ocasio-Cortez. In April 2020, he incorrectly stated that climate scientists' models of the effects of climate change do not use the "scientific method".

In 2005, Cornyn voted against including oil and gas smokestacks in mercury regulations. He voted against factoring global warming into federal project planning, and against banning drilling in the Arctic National Wildlife Refuge. He also voted against removing oil and gas exploration subsidies. During his tenure in the Senate, Cornyn has scored 0% on the League of Conservation Voters' environmental scorecard, a system of ranking politicians according to their voting record on environmental legislation.

Health care

Cornyn opposes the Affordable Care Act. He voted against it in 2009, and played a leading role in the attempts to repeal the Affordable Care Act in 2017. He voted against the Health Care and Education Reconciliation Act of 2010. Cornyn said that Senator Ted Cruz's 2013 efforts to defund the Affordable Care Act by threatening to default on the U.S. government's debt obligations were "unachievable", adding, "the shutdown did not help our cause. What did help our cause was the president's implementation of the Affordable Care Act, which has overwhelmed everything else. I don't hear anyone thinking that another government shutdown is the way to achieve our goals." Cornyn joined other Republican leaders to block Cruz's procedural move to reject an increase in the debt ceiling.

Guns
In January 2014, Cornyn introduced the "Constitutional Concealed Carry Reciprocity Act". The bill would provide interstate reciprocity for persons with concealed weapons permits. Cornyn described the bill: "It's like a driver's license. It doesn't trump state laws. Say you have a carry permit in Texas; then you use it in another state that has a concealed-carry law." He received an "A" rating from the National Rifle Association in 2003 and 2014;  his NRA rating was "A+". Cornyn continued to support Concealed Carry Reciprocity as of 2018, with the Republican-held House of Representatives passing a bill in late 2017 with this language attached to gun control measures from the Senate's Fix NICS bill.

In 2017, Cornyn helped Democrats pass legislation designed to aid federal agencies in alerting, reporting and recording gun purchases by creating a universal cross-agency database.

In 2022, in the wake of the Robb Elementary School shooting, Cornyn opposed further background check laws and those limiting the types of weapons that adults may purchase. He later became one of ten Republican senators to support a bipartisan agreement on gun control, which included a red flag provision, support for state crisis intervention orders, funding for school safety resources, stronger background checks for buyers under 21, and penalties for straw purchases.

LGBT rights

While serving on the Texas Supreme Court in the 1990s, Cornyn ruled with the majority to overturn a lower court ruling, State v. Morales, that had found Texas's anti-sodomy laws to be unconstitutional. During oral arguments, he questioned the merits of the case, asking how gay individuals were harmed by the anti-sodomy laws if those laws were not enforced. According to Yale Law School professor William Eskridge, Cornyn "engineered the Morales majority" that saved the sodomy law. When running for the Senate in 2002, Cornyn defended the law. In 2003, the U.S. Supreme Court overturned Texas's sodomy law in Lawrence v. Texas.

After Lawrence v. Texas, the U.S. Supreme Court decision finding anti-sodomy unconstitutional, Cornyn condemned the "startling display of judicial activism that so threatens our fundamental institutions and our values". He said he worried that the Supreme Court would next overturn the Defense of Marriage Act, which prohibited recognition of same-sex marriage at the federal level, and subsequently played a leading role in trying to introduce a constitutional amendment to prohibit same-sex marriage. Cornyn argued that recognition of same-sex marriage harmed those who were in heterosexual marriages. He claimed that children raised by gay couples are "at higher risk of a host of social ills", such as crime, drug use and dropping out of school, arguing that same-sex would put "more and more children at risk through a radical social experiment". Cornyn opposed adoption of children by gay couples.

In 2012, when President Obama announced his support for same-sex marriage, Cornyn criticized Obama and accused him of trying to "divide the country".

In 2021, when President Joe Biden reversed Trump's ban on transgender troops serving in the military, Cornyn accused Biden of dividing the country.

In 2022, at the Supreme Court confirmation hearings of Ketanji Brown Jackson, Cornyn expressed his position that state governments ought to have the power to ban same-sex marriage. The Supreme Court held in Obergefell v. Hodges that the 14th amendment barred states from doing so.

Victims' rights

Cornyn opposes profiting from memorabilia tied to convicted murderers, and has made several unsuccessful attempts to pass laws against it.

Election law
In 2021, Cornyn helped Senate Republicans filibuster national election reform legislation. Cornyn described the bill, which exclusively received support from members of the Democratic Party, as a "politically-motivated federal takeover of our elections."

Removal of Confederate statues

Cornyn opposes the removal of statues relating to the Confederate States of America. He has said, "I don't think we can go back and erase our history by removing statues."

Electoral history

Personal life
Cornyn and his wife, Sandy Hansen, have two daughters. Cornyn receives pensions from three separate state and local governments in addition to his Senate salary.

As of 2018, according to OpenSecrets.org, Cornyn's net worth was more than $1.8 million.

References

External links

Senator John Cornyn official U.S. Senate website
John Cornyn for Senate

Collected news and commentary at The Texas Tribune

|-

|-

|-

|-

|-

|-

|-

|-

|-

|-

|-

|-

1952 births
20th-century American politicians
21st-century American politicians
American members of the Churches of Christ
American prosecutors
American School in Japan alumni
Living people
Politicians from Austin, Texas
Politicians from Houston
Protestants from Texas
Republican Party United States senators from Texas
St. Mary's University School of Law alumni
Texas Attorneys General
Texas lawyers
Texas Republicans
Justices of the Texas Supreme Court
Trinity University (Texas) alumni
University of Virginia School of Law alumni